Larman is a surname. Notable people with the surname include:

Craig Larman (born 1958), Canadian computer scientist and author
Drew Larman (born 1985), American ice hockey player

See also
Laraman (surname)
Layman (surname)